Paul O'Sullivan (born 6 Dec 1959) is a New Zealand born thoroughbred racehorse trainer.

O'Sullivan trained in partnership with his father, Dave O’Sullivan, for 17 years in New Zealand. He was the champion trainer in New Zealand on 11 occasions.

O'Sullivan moved to Hong Kong to train in 2004. In 2010/11, O'Sullivan brought up his double century of winners in Hong Kong. In 2022 he finished there with 516 wins and total earnings of HK$525,837,109.

Paul is the brother of New Zealand premiership winning jockey Lance O'Sullivan.

Significant horses

 Aerovelocity (Naisoso Warrior), winner of the 2014 and 2016 Hong Kong Sprint, 2015 KrisFlyer International Sprint and Takamatsunomiya Kinen, 2016 Centenary Sprint Cup
 Coogee Walk, winner of the 1998 Railway Stakes
 Ensign Ewart, winner of the 1994 Railway Stakes
 Fellowship, winner of the 2010 Hong Kong Stewards' Cup
 High Regards, winner of the 1985 Telegraph Handicap
 Horlicks, winner of the 1989 Japan Cup 
 Miltak, winner of the 1994 Auckland Cup and BMW Stakes
 Morar, winner of the 1992 Telegraph Handicap
 Mr Tiz, winner of the 1989, 1990 and 1991 Railway Stakes, 1989 and 1990 Telegraph Handicap, 1991 Waikato Sprint, 1991 The Galaxy (ATC)
 Nimue, winner of the 1992 Levin Classic
 O'Reilly, winner of the 1996 Levin Classic, 1997 Telegraph Handicap
 Popsy, winner of the 1993 New Zealand Derby
 Silver Tip, winner of the 1986 Railway Stakes
 Snap, winner of the 1994 New Zealand Oaks & 1995 Waikato Sprint
 Surfers Paradise, winner of the 1990 New Zealand Derby and 1991 Cox Plate
 Vital King, winner of the 2007 Hong Kong Derby
 Waverley Star

See also
 Thoroughbred racing in New Zealand

References

The Hong Kong Jockey Club – Trainer Information
The Hong Kong Jockey Club 

Hong Kong horse trainers
1959 births
Living people
New Zealand racehorse trainers